The Ladies of Nambudiri Brahmins are called Antharjanam.

Famous Antharjanams
 Kaippilly Aryadevi Antarjanam (Aryamba) - Mother of Adi Shankara
 Lalithambika Antharjanam - Famous Malayalam Author

See also
 Nambudiri

Malayali Brahmins